Corunna ( CORE-UN-NUH) is a city and county seat of Shiawassee County in the U.S. state of Michigan.  The population was 3,497 at the 2010 census.  The city is surrounded by Caledonia Charter Township and is slightly east of the city of Owosso.

History
Corunna was platted in 1837. It was made the county seat in 1840, incorporated as a village in 1858 and made a city in 1869.  Andrew Parsons, tenth Michigan Governor (March 8, 1853 – January 3, 1855), was a long-time resident of Corunna. A historical marker commemorating Parsons in Corunna was erected in 1969.

The city's name comes from the Spanish city A Coruña, in the north of Spain.

Geography

Transportation

Highways

Airport
 Owosso Community Airport is located just northwest of the city in Caledonia Township.

Demographics

2010 census
As of the census of 2010, there were 3,497 people, 1,384 households, and 851 families living in the city. The racial makeup of the city was 95.0% White, 1.2% African American, 0.4% Native American, 1.3% Asian, 0.6% from other races, and 1.5% from two or more races. Hispanic or Latino of any race were 2.4% of the population.

There were 1,384 households, of which 33.5% had children under the age of 18 living with them, 39.0% were married couples living together, 17.7% had a female householder with no husband present, 4.8% had a male householder with no wife present, and 38.5% were non-families. 32.0% of all households were made up of individuals, and 9.9% had someone living alone who was 65 years of age or older. The average household size was 2.34 and the average family size was 2.94.

The median age in the city was 36 years. 23.6% of residents were under the age of 18; 11.6% were between the ages of 18 and 24; 25.4% were from 25 to 44; 24.6% were from 45 to 64; and 14.7% were 65 years of age or older. The gender makeup of the city was 47.8% male and 52.2% female.

2000 census
As of the census of 2000, there were 3,381 people, 1,320 households, and 819 families living in the city. The racial makeup of the city was 96.36% White, 1.06% African American, 0.65% Native American, 0.21% Asian, 0.56% from other races, and 1.15% from two or more races. Hispanic or Latino of any race were 2.54% of the population.

There were 1,320 households, out of which 32.3% had children under the age of 18 living with them, 43.4% were married couples living together, 14.1% had a female householder with no husband present, and 37.9% were non-families. 32.1% of all households were made up of individuals, and 11.7% had someone living alone who was 65 years of age or older.  The average household size was 2.33 and the average family size was 2.94.

In the city, the population was spread out, with 23.0% under the age of 18, 12.8% from 18 to 24, 28.5% from 25 to 44, 19.8% from 45 to 64, and 15.9% who were 65 years of age or older.  The median age was 35 years. For every 100 females, there were 93.5 males.  For every 100 females age 18 and over, there were 88.4 males.

The median income for a household in the city was $29,831, and the median income for a family was $41,705. Males had a median income of $29,668 versus $22,875 for females. The per capita income for the city was $17,053.  About 10.0% of families and 12.0% of the population were below the poverty line, including 14.1% of those under age 18 and 13.9% of those age 65 or over.

Film
In 2005, filmmaker Bryan McGuire produced/directed/wrote a documentary chronicling what life in Corunna is like entitled Stay on the Tarvey. The film included interviews with current and former residents and explored topics such as race relations, family values and "hickdom".

Schools

Elementary Schools:
Corunna Public School
Louise Peacock Elementary 
Elsa Meyer Elementary 

Middle Schools:
Corunna Middle School

High Schools:
Corunna High School

Notable people
 Martha Arnold Boughton (1857–1928), educator, author
 Andrew Parsons, Michigan governor from 1853–1855
 Earl Rapp, pitcher for five Major League Baseball teams, member of Pacific Coast League Hall of Fame

See also 
 Corunna Coal Company - Michigan's first coal mine.

References

Notes

Sources

External links
City of Corunna
SRESD
Corunna High School Homepage

Cities in Shiawassee County, Michigan
County seats in Michigan
Populated places established in 1858
1858 establishments in Michigan